Syeda Aroob Shah (born 31 December 2003) is a Pakistani cricketer who plays as a right-arm leg break bowler for Pakistan. In October 2019, she was added to Pakistan's squad for their series against Bangladesh. She made her Women's One Day International (WODI) debut for Pakistan, against Bangladesh, on 4 November 2019. She made her Women's Twenty20 International (WT20I) debut for Pakistan, also against England, on 17 December 2019. In January 2020, she was named in Pakistan's squad for the 2020 ICC Women's T20 World Cup in Australia. In December 2020, she was shortlisted as one of the Women's Emerging Cricketer of the Year for the 2020 PCB Awards.

References

External links
 
 

2003 births
Living people
Cricketers from Karachi
Pakistani women cricketers
Pakistan women One Day International cricketers
Pakistan women Twenty20 International cricketers
Karachi women cricketers